Neoplecostomus botucatu is a species of catfish in the family Loricariidae. It is native to South America, where it is known only from the Pardo River basin near Botucatu in the state of São Paulo in Brazil. The species reaches 10.2 cm (4 inches) in standard length. Its specific name, botucatu, refers to the municipality where specimens of the species were collected.

References 

botucatu
Fish described in 2012
Catfish of South America
Freshwater fish of Brazil